Chondracanthidae is a family of parasitic copepods, usually found infecting the branchial chamber of demersal fishes. It comprises the following genera:

Acanthocanthopsis Heegaard, 1945
Acanthochondria Oakley, 1930
Acanthochondrites Oakley, 1930
Andreina Brian, 1939
Apodochondria Ho & Dojiri, 1988
Argentinochondria Etchegoin, Timi & Sardella, 2003
Auchenochondria Dojiri & Perkins, 1979
Bactrochondria Ho, I. H. Kim & Kumar, 2000
Berea Yamaguti, 1963
Bereacanthus Huys, 2009
Blias Krøyer, 1863
Brachiochondria Shiino, 1957
Brachiochondrites Markevich, 1940
Brasilochondria Thatcher & Pereira Júnior, 2004
Ceratochondria Yu, 1935
Chelonichondria Ho, 1994
Chondracanthodes C. B. Wilson, 1932
Chondracanthus Delaroche, 1811
Cryptochondria Izawa, 1971
Diocus Krøyer, 1863
Heterochondria Yu, 1935
Hoia Avdeev & Kazachenko, 1986
Humphreysia Leigh-Sharpe, 1934
Immanthe Leigh-Sharpe, 1934
Juanettia C. B. Wilson, 1921
Jusheyhoea Villalba & Fernandez, 1985
Lagochondria Ho & Dojiri, 1988
Lateracanthus Kabata & Gussev, 1966
Lernentoma Blainville, 1822
Markevitchielinus Titar, 1975
Mecaderochondria Ho & Dojiri, 1987
Medesicaste Kroyer, 1863
Neobrachiochondria Kabata, 1969
Pharodes C. B. Wilson, 1935
Praecidochondria Kabata, 1968
Prochondracanthopsis Shiino, 1960
Prochondracanthus Yamaguti, 1939
Protochondracanthus Kirtisinghe, 1950
Protochondria Ho, 1970
Pseudacanthocanthopsis Yamaguti & Yamasu, 1959
Pseudoblias Heegaard, 1962
Pseudochondracanthus C. B. Wilson, 1908
Pseudodiocus Ho, 1972
Pseudolernentoma Luque & Alves, 2003
Rhynchochondria Ho, 1967
Rohdea Kabata, 1992
Scheherazade Leigh-Sharpe, 1934
Strabax von Nordmann, 1864

References 

Poecilostomatoida
Parasitic crustaceans
Taxa named by Henri Milne-Edwards
Crustacean families